The Peace Palace, also known as the Office of the Prime Minister of Cambodia, is the principal workplace of the Prime Minister of Cambodia. It is located in Phnom Penh. The building was officially inaugurated by King Norodom Sihamoni on 19 October 2010. Its overall cost was US$50 million. Aside from being the office of the Prime Minister, the Peace Palace has also chaired the East Asia Summit in 2012 and many other meetings with foreign leaders.

Gallery

References

Government buildings completed in 2010
Prime ministerial residences
Buildings and structures in Phnom Penh